St George's Church, Tombland, Norwich is a Grade I listed parish church in Norwich.

History

The church is medieval dating from the 15th century. Legacies were left for the building of the tower in 1445.

Organ

The church contained an organ which dated from 1865 by A and SJ Godball. A specification of the organ can be found on the National Pipe Organ Register.

Gallery

References

Saint George
15th-century church buildings in England
Grade I listed churches in Norfolk